Barrhead was a provincial electoral district in Alberta mandated to return a single member to the Legislative Assembly of Alberta using first-past-the-post balloting from 1971 to 1993.

History

Boundary history
Barrhead replaced the district of Pembina in the redistribution that took effect in 1971, centred around the town of Barrhead. In 1979 its southern boundary was extended to the north shore of Lac Ste. Anne, and extended further south again in 1986.

In the redistribution that took effect in 1993, the riding was replaced by Barrhead-Westlock and its southern portion was transferred to Whitecourt-Ste. Anne.

Representation history

The first representative for Barrhead was one-term Progressive Conservative MLA for Lac Ste. Anne Hugh Horner, who had captured his seat from the governing Social Credit in 1967. He occupied several posts in Peter Lougheed's cabinet over his career, but retired shortly after winning his fourth term as MLA in 1979.

The resulting by-election was the closest result in the history of the district, with Liberal leader Nicholas Taylor running for the seat. Progressive Conservative Candidate Ken Kowalski, however, would narrowly retain Barrhead for the government. He also served in cabinet and, when the district was abolished in 1993, went on to serve as MLA for Barrhead-Westlock.

Election results

Elections in the 1970s

Elections in the 1980s

See also
List of Alberta provincial electoral districts

References

Further reading

External links
Elections Alberta
The Legislative Assembly of Alberta

Former provincial electoral districts of Alberta
Barrhead, Alberta